Floris Jansen (born 10 June 1962) is a former Dutch cricketer. He played two One Day Internationals for The Netherlands.

References

1962 births
Living people
Dutch cricketers
Netherlands One Day International cricketers